Florent Gregoire Poulolo (born 2 January 1997) is a Martiniquais professional footballer who plays as a central defender for Czech club Sigma Olomouc.

Club career
Born in Fort-de-France, Poulolo started his career with local side Aiglon du Lamentin FC, and moved to France at the age of 15 after joining INF Clairefontaine. He subsequently represented JA Drancy and AC Arles-Avignon, finishing his formation with the latter in 2015.

Poulolo made his senior debut with Arles' reserves during the 2015–16 season in the Championnat de France Amateur 2, while also appearing for the first team in the Championnat de France Amateur. However, the club was dissolved in October, and he joined Olympique Alès in June of the following year.

On 9 August 2018, Poulolo moved to Spanish side Getafe CF, being initially assigned to the B-team in Tercera División. He immediately became a regular starter for the side, contributing with four goals in 27 matches (play-offs included) and achieving promotion to Segunda División B; the last of his goals was in a 4–1 home routing of CD Lealtad in the play-offs, to overcome a 0–2 deficit in the first leg.

Poulolo made his first team debut for Geta on 18 December 2019, starting in a 2–1 away win against El Palmar CF for the season's Copa del Rey. His La Liga debut occurred the following 13 July, as he came on as a late substitute for Erick Cabaco in a 0–0 draw at Deportivo Alavés.

On 9 September 2020, Poulolo moved to Czech side Sigma Olomouc.

International career
Poulolo was called up to represent the Martinique national team for a pair of friendlies in March 2022.

References

External links

1997 births
Living people
Sportspeople from Fort-de-France
Martiniquais footballers
French footballers
Association football defenders
Championnat National 2 players
Championnat National 3 players
AC Arlésien players
Olympique Alès players
Getafe CF B players
Getafe CF footballers
SK Sigma Olomouc players
La Liga players
Segunda División B players
Tercera División players
Czech First League players
French expatriate footballers
Martiniquais expatriate footballers
Expatriate footballers in Spain
Expatriate footballers in the Czech Republic
French expatriate sportspeople in Spain
French expatriate sportspeople in the Czech Republic
Martiniquais  expatriate sportspeople in Spain
Martiniquais expatriate sportspeople in the Czech Republic
French people of Martiniquais descent